Glass beads composed of soda lime glass are essential for providing retroreflectivity in many kinds of road surface markings.  Retroreflectivity occurs when incident light from vehicles is refracted within glass beads that are imbedded in road surface markings and then reflected back into the driver's field of view.  In North America, approximately 227 million kilograms of glass beads are used for road surface markings annually.  Roughly 520 kilograms of glass beads are used per mile during remarking of a five lane highway system, and road remarking can occur every two to five years.  In the United States, the massive demand for glass beads has led to importing from countries using outdated manufacturing regulations and techniques.  These techniques include the use of heavy metals such as arsenic, antimony, and lead during the manufacturing process as decolorizes and fining agents.  It has been found that the heavy metals become incorporated into the bead's glass matrix and may leach under environmental conditions that roads experience.

Composition and manufacturing 

The synthesis of these beads begins when calcium carbonate is heated to anywhere from 800-1300C. This heating causes a decomposition reaction which forms solid calcium oxide and releases carbon dioxide gas.

CaCO3  ->[{800-1300C}]{CaO(s)} + CO2(g)

Similarly, sodium carbonate decomposes to sodium oxide and releases carbon dioxide gas.

Na2CO3 -> [{800-1300C}] {Na2O(s)} + CO2(g)

Sodium oxide is then reacted with silica to produce sodium silicate liquid glass.

{Na2O(s)}+SiO2(s) -> Na2SiO3(l) 

Lastly, to complete the general structure of the soda-lime glass, calcium oxide is dissolved in solution with sodium silicate glass, which ultimately reduces the softening temperature of the glass. Additional metals and ions are added to this melted glass to improve its properties, and the compound is then sprayed and formed into beads using either the direct or indirect method.
{Na2SiO3(l)}+ CaO(s) -> Na2O*CaO*SiO2

Overall, the percent composition of major compounds found in the final glass bead product is shown below.

In addition to these primary components of soda-lime glass, manufacturers include heavy metals arsenic, antimony, and lead to refine and improve the properties of the glass bead.  Lead in the form of PbO is added to increase the durability of the glass to withstand harsh road conditions.  Arsenic and antimony are used as fining agents that facilitate the removal of gas bubbles from the molten mixture.  Carbon dioxide produced by the decomposition of calcium carbonate and sodium carbonate is removed to obtain the required retroreflective properties of the glass.  In addition, both arsenic and antimony are used as decolorizers. Having a colorless glass is crucial to maximizing retroreflectivity. Arsenic in its inorganic form assists in the decolorization of the glass by controlling iron’s oxidation state. Arsenic oxidizes ferrous oxide to its less colorful counterpart, ferric oxide.{As2O5}+4Fe3O4->{As2O3} + 6Fe2O3

Antimony in the form of Sb2O5 performs a similar reaction as arsenic, oxidizing ferrous oxide to ferric oxide.

{Sb2O5} + 4Fe3O4 -> {Sb2O3}+6Fe2O3 

While these three heavy metals can typically be found in both domestic and imported glass beads, they vary in concentration. According to the US Environmental Protection Agency, the Resource Conservation and Recovery Act limits the levels of heavy metal content in accordance with their toxicity. Due to increasing demands for marked roads, however, the majority of glass beads used in the U.S. are imported from countries with little to no regulation on heavy metal content. For example, beads obtained from North America contain approximately 15 mg of arsenic per kg of beads, while some from China have concentrations of up to 1000 mg/kg. Imported bead concentrations of each of these metals are listed in the table below.

Degradation of glass beads 
Environmental conditions can cause degradation of glass beads, leading to release of incorporated heavy metals into the environment. While abrasion may dislodge these beads from the road marking itself, the reaction of these beads with an aqueous environment vastly accelerate their decomposition and heavy metal release.

There are three reactions involved in the corrosion of silicon dioxide. The first is an ion exchange reaction, in which mobile ions of a solution are exchanged for those of similar charge on the solid. Particularly, this reaction is involving cation exchange material, where a negatively charged structural backbone allows the replacement of positively charged cations. This reaction involved in the degradation of soda lime beads shows various ions that are interaction with the silicon-oxygen network (e.g. Na+, Ca^2+, K+, Mg^2+) being replaced with a hydrogen ion.

{{Si-O^-} Na+} + ({H^+} + OH^-) -> {Si-OH} + {Na+} +OH-

In addition to this reaction, a hydroxyl ion can attack the Si-O bond causing dissolution of the SiO2 matrix and creating silanol and non-bridging oxygen groups.

{Si-O-Si} + {OH^-} -> {Si-OH} + {^-O-Si}

As dissolution occurs, the non-bridging oxygen groups can abstract hydrogen ions from solution.

{Si-O^-} + ({H^+} + OH^-) -> {Si-OH}+{OH^-}

An increase in the concentration of hydroxyl ions comes with increased alkalinity of the aqueous solution. This increase in pH has shown, in varying column leaching studies, to increase the reduction potential and DOC (dissolved organic carbon) concentration of the solution. This ultimately leads to an increase in mobility of many metals including arsenic, copper, and nickel.

The mobility of these heavy metals are therefore affected by the presence of alkali oxides. The Na+, Ca^2+, Mg^2+, and K+ ions can associate with the tetrahedral networks of silicon and oxygen, forming a trigonal antiprism network. In trigonal antiprism formation, the ions coordinate with three oxygen atoms at a distance of 2.3 angstroms and then another three oxygen atoms at a nonbonding distance of 3 angstroms. As the concentration of alkali oxides increases in metal beads, the probability of chemical attack increases due to the more open and accessible glass chemical network and structure.

Heavy metal speciation and leaching 
During both routine road marking removal and harsh environmental conditions, these glass beads can degrade and leach incorporated heavy metals.  Although the exact mechanism of heavy metal incorporation into the glass beads is unknown, current literature hypothesizes that the heavy metals are associated with alkali and alkali earth metals on the surface of glass beads.  Environmental conditions relevant to road surfaces such as pH, different salts, and ionic strength strongly influence the leaching process.  In particular, pH determines the speciation of the heavy metal which is critical for solubility in the aqueous phase.  The following graphs show the speciation of heavy metals as a function of pH.

Few states have regulations on leached concentrations of heavy metals.  For example, New Jersey limits arsenic to 3 µg/L, lead to 65 µg/L, and antimony to 78 µg/L.   In studies that subjected batches of glass beads to environmental conditions in a lab setting, 96% of the leached concentrations of arsenic exceeded 3 µg/L, 75% of leached lead exceeded 65 µg/L, and 27% of the leached concentrations of antimony exceeded the criterion of 78 µg/L.  The following graphs show the total concentrations of heavy metals leached from glass beads after 160 days as a function of pH, salt type, and ionic strength.

Interaction with roadside soil 
Once the arsenic is mobilized in aqueous form, humic substances interact with arsenic. It has been shown that particularly under acidic environments, humic acids contribute immensely to the retention of arsenic in the soil matrix. While an exact mechanism for this has not been confirmed, it has been hypothesized that humic acids are acting as anion exchange moieties, potentially through amine interaction within the humic material with arsenic. This is only likely if the amine is quaternary, thus justifying the low pH claim, as similar resins are used to separate As(III) and As(V). Another possible mechanism of arsenic’s interaction with humic substances is through metal complexes. Potentially, arsenic adsorption could occur as a humic-acid-metal-As bridging ligand, or possibly adsorbed to the clay that is bound to the humic acid itself as well.

Lead, on the other hand, has been shown to increase binding to humic substances with increasing pH and decreasing ionic strength. Research has indicated that monodentate lead binds at a relatively high measure to carboxylic type groups present in humic materials. There is also evidence of the bidentate form of lead binding to phenolic-type groups in the ortho position in humic material when concentrations of lead are high, as is the case for soils nearby marked roads.

In the case of antinomy, qualitative studies on its association with humic substances is scarce and rarely conclusive. It has been shown in many cases, however, that pH has little indication on these interactions. One study indicated that organic ligands that possess carboxylic groups or hydroxyl groups create stable bidentate chelates in its speciation as As(III) and As(V). Another indicated that As(III) when bound to humic material is easily oxidized, and can be released back into aqueous solution as (SbOH)6-, thus showing that As(V) is more commonly bound to humic material. The details of how this binding occurs mechanistically remains relatively unresolved, but knowledge of the primary form of its binding is important to furthering this research.

Alternative to heavy metal usage 
Retroreflectivity is essential to safe driving conditions.  While metals are necessary to achieve these goals, there are other, non-toxic metals that can achieve the same results. These may include zirconium, tungsten, titanium, and barium. The amount of these metals that could be incorporated into the glass varies based on its country of origins and the regulations placed on those countries, but further research on alternatives to heavy metal usage in road markings would assist in reducing heavy metal leachate near roadside soils.

See also
Road surface marking
Toxic heavy metal

References

External links

 U.S. Federal Highway Administration—Learn About Pavement Markings

Road surface markings